Snap parliamentary elections were held in Armenia on 20 June 2021. The elections had initially been scheduled for 9 December 2023, but were called earlier due to a political crisis following the 2020 Nagorno-Karabakh War and an alleged attempted coup in February 2021.

Nikol Pashinyan, who had served as Prime Minister since 2018, resigned in April 2021 and subsequently the seventh National Assembly was dissolved on 10 May. Pashinyan continued to serve as acting prime minister until the elections were held. Following the election, Pashinyan's Civil Contract party received 54% of the vote and won 71 seats, a majority in the 107-seat parliament. The opposition Armenia Alliance, finished second with 29 seats, while the I Have Honor Alliance won 7 seats. No other party or alliance surpassed the electoral threshold required to win a seat. The opposition claimed there had been electoral fraud during the elections, while the OSCE assessed the election as meeting international standards and described it as; "marred by increasingly inflammatory rhetoric" but was "positive overall."

Background
After six weeks of war with Azerbaijan, on 9 November 2020 prime minister Nikol Pashinyan, president of Azerbaijan Ilham Aliyev and Russian president Vladimir Putin reached and signed a ceasefire agreement. Following the announcement of this deal, violent protests erupted in Yerevan. The National Assembly was stormed and its speaker Ararat Mirzoyan was beaten by an angry mob.

Pashinyan faced continuous calls for his resignation and mass rallies calling for him to step down. On 25 February 2021, the Chief of the General Staff of the Armenian Armed Forces Onik Gasparyan and more than 40 other top-ranking generals demanded Pashinyan's resignation, which Pashinyan described as a coup attempt, causing a political crisis that ended with Gasparyan's dismissal.

On 25 April 2021, Pashinyan announced his formal resignation, prompting the dissolution of the National Assembly and the call for snap elections on 20 June of that year.

Electoral system

The members of the unicameral National Assembly are elected by party-list proportional representation. The number of seats is at least 101, and rises when allocation of additional seats is required. Seats are allocated using the d'Hondt method with an election threshold of 5% for parties and 7% for multi-party alliances. However, a minimum of three political groups will enter parliament, regardless of the performance of the third-best performing party or alliance.

Seats are allocated to parties using their national share of the vote. Four seats are reserved for national minorities (Assyrians, Kurds, Russians and Yazidis), with parties having separate lists for the four groups. A gender quota requires any top section of a party list to include at least 33% candidates of each gender.

If a party receives a majority of the vote but wins less than 54% of the seats, they will be awarded additional seats to give them 54% of the total. If one party wins over two-thirds of the seats, the losing parties which made it over the threshold will be given extra seats reducing the share of seats of the winning party to two-thirds. If a government is not formed within six days of the preliminary results being released, a run-off round between the top two parties must be held on the 28th day. The party that wins the run-off will be given the additional seats required for a 54% majority, with all seats allocated in the first round preserved.

COVID-19 pandemic
Facing the COVID-19 pandemic in Armenia, the government has implemented inconsistent health measures. The Electoral Code does not provide for mail-in voting or early voting.

Schedule
Participating parties and alliances were required to submit applications with all supporting documentation by 18:00 on 26 May. The electoral lists of the political parties and alliances of parties were registered by 31 May.

The official election campaign took place from 7 to 18 June.
Voting took place on 20 June from 8am to 8pm.

Participating political forces
Four alliances and 23 parties submitted documents to Armenia's Central Electoral Commission (CEC) in order to register for the elections. This is a significant increase in the number of parties competing, as only nine parties and two alliances had competed in the parliamentary elections held two years earlier.
Several of the parties and all of the alliances were established in 2020 or 2021, following Armenia's defeat in the 2020 Nagorno-Karabakh war. In total, four alliances and 23 parties participated in the election.

Notes:
 Registered as an alliance, implying 7% election threshold
 Diverse estimates.
 Yes/No - as claimed; other info - as estimated.
 5% for parties and 7% for registered alliances.
was removed from election list after failing to prove residency in Armenia

Declined participation or failed to register 
The Christian-Democratic Rebirth Party decided to withdraw its application to participate in the elections as an independent entity; instead the party participated as a part of the Shirinyan-Babajanyan Alliance of Democrats.

On 7 June, leader of the Armenian Eagles Unified Armenia Party, Khachik Asryan, said that his party is terminating their election campaign and won't participate in elections. He called to cancel elections at large until the border regions of Armenia are liberated from Azerbaijani occupation.

The Democratic Way Party boycotted the election, claiming the election would be rigged.

Endorsements

Foreign elections monitoring missions
Eight monitoring missions, including from the OSCE/ODIHR and the CIS registered to observe the elections. A total of 250 short-term observers arrived from the ODHIR and 70 observers from various CIS countries, monitored the elections.

There were 8 monitoring missions in the 2018 parliamentary elections and 6 missions in the 2017 parliamentary elections.

Opinion polls

Results

In the evening of 20 June, Tigran Mukuchyan, head of the Central Electoral Commission announced the preliminary results; Pashinyan's Civil Contract party was leading with 58.5 percent of the vote and 72 seats of the National Assembly, 16 less than in 2018, while former President Robert Kocharyan's Armenia Alliance had 18.8 percent with 27 seats. The third political force was I Have Honor Alliance, with 5.23 percent and 6 seats.

Acting Prime Minister Nikol Pashinyan claimed victory in the snap election but moments later Kocharyan's alliance rejected the outcome, saying it would not recognize the results until alleged voting irregularities were addressed. Meanwhile, Tigran Mukuchyan stated "On the whole, the election was conducted in accordance with the country's legislation."

President Armen Sarkissian called on his compatriots to remain peaceful, because it would be unacceptable to "overstep political and moral boundaries, escalate the situation and foment hatred and enmity".

On 21 June, the Central Electoral Commission confirmed the results.

On 22 June, Kocharyan stated in an interview, and in the face of speculation that the elected Armenia Alliance deputies would not accept the position in an attempt to boycott parliament, that he believed they should accept it but "I don't see myself in the parliament because I am more of an executive". At the same time, he affirmed that the alliance would soon submit to the Constitutional Court a report proving the existence of violations of the electoral procedure. He also acknowledged that the cause of his defeat could be the lack of work during the campaign in rural areas.

Reactions 
 International
 : The Council of Europe Secretary General Marija Pejčinović Burić sent a congratulatory message to Nikol Pashinyan on the successful conduct of the parliamentary elections and confirmed that the elections were generally well organized. The statement further read, "I reaffirm the readiness of the Council of Europe to continue to support Armenia in the reform process, based on the standards of human rights, democracy and the rule of law."
 : President of the European Council, Charles Michel, said "warm congratulations to Nikol Pashinyan on elections victory. The EU stands by Armenia in support of deepening reforms. We are also ready to further support regional stabilisation and comprehensive conflict settlement."
  Organization for Security and Co-operation in Europe: OSCE said in a statement that the elections were "competitive and generally well-managed within a short timeframe." The OSCE observers noted that they were "characterized by intense polarization and marred by increasingly inflammatory rhetoric among key contestants" but assessed the election day and the vote count "positively overall."
 : The United States Department of State issued a press statement congratulating the Armenian people and acknowledging that "voters’ human rights and fundamental freedoms were generally respected, contestants were able to campaign freely, and that ODIHR assessed election-day vote counting as positive." Also called for "respect the results of these elections once certified, employ the legal election grievance process to address issues of concern, and avoid political retaliation."
: The Canadian Foreign Ministry congratulated Armenian authorities on concluding successful parliamentary elections. “We look forward to collaborating with our Armenian partners to continue our efforts to promote democracy in the country as well as a resolution of the Nagorno Karabakh conflict”, the statement read.
: Kremlin Press Secretary Dmitry Peskov said that Pashinyan won a "convincing victory."
 Armenia and Diaspora
 The Future Armenian public initiative congratulated the citizens of Armenia on concluding snap parliamentary elections during difficult times for the country, and expressed a hope that "the representatives of the elected parties will serve by working hard to ensure solidarity across all Armenians, overcoming unprecedented challenges to strengthen the state and nation”.

See also

Elections in Armenia
List of political parties in Armenia
Programs of political parties in Armenia

References

Armenia
Armenia
Parliamentary
Nikol Pashinyan
Parliamentary elections in Armenia
Parliamentary